L'après-midi d'un faune (or "The Afternoon of a Faun") is a poem by the French author Stéphane Mallarmé. It describes the sensual experiences of a faun who has just woken up from his afternoon sleep and discusses his encounters with several nymphs during the morning in a dreamlike monologue.

It is Mallarmé's best-known work and a hallmark in the history of symbolism in French literature. Paul Valéry considered it to be the greatest poem in French literature.

History

Initial versions of the poem, originally titled Le Faune, intermède héroique were written between 1865 (the first mention of the poem is found in a letter Mallarmé wrote to Henri Cazalis in June 1865) and 1867. Mallarmé submitted the first text to the Théâtre-Français in 1867, only to be rejected. Ten years later, under the title Improvisation d’un Faune the work was rejected again, this time by publisher Alphonse Lemerre, who had previously published Mallarmé's work in Parnasse contemporain. Mallarmé left Lemerre and found Alphonse Derenne, an editor, publisher, and bookseller of primarily medical books who sought to expand his business. The final text was published in 1876 (see 1876 in poetry) by Derenne under the present title L'après-midi d'un faune. For the publication, Mallarmé's long-time friend, Édouard Manet, created four wood-engraved embellishments which were printed in black, and hand-tinted in pink by Manet himself in order to save money.

Mallarmé's poem would provide the inspiration for many musical works, the most prominent of which being Prélude à l'après-midi d'un faune by Claude Debussy. Other composers who drew subject matter and inspiration from Mallarmé’s poetry include Maurice Ravel in Trois poèmes de Mallarmé (1913), Darius Milhaud with Chansons bas de Stéphane Mallarmé (1917), and Pierre Boulez, with his hour-long solo soprano and orchestra piece Pli selon pli (1957–62).  The poem also served basis for the ballets Afternoon of a Faun by Vaslav Nijinsky (1912), Jerome Robbins (1953) and Tim Rushton (2006).  Debussy's orchestral work and Nijinsky's ballet would be of great significance in the development of modernism in the arts.

Editions

Translations
 (English) The Afternoon of the Faun, translated by Roger Fry, in The Poems of Mallarmé, Chatto and Windus, 1936 
 (English) A Faun in the Afternoon, translated by E. H. Blackmore and A. M. Blackmore, in Collected Poems and Other Verse, 2006
 (English) Collected Poems: A Bilingual Edition, Stéphane Mallarmé, translated by Henry Weinfield, University of California Press,  (1st edition 1994 ; 2nd edition 2011 )
 (Finnish) Faunin iltapäivä: valitut runot, Einari Aaltonen, 2006

Notes

Sources
Hendrik Lücke. Mallarmé - Debussy. Eine vergleichende Studie zur Kunstanschauung am Beispiel von "L'Après-midi d'un Faune". (Studien zur Musikwissenschaft, Vol. 4). Dr. Kovac, Hamburg 2005, .

External links

The poem in French on wikisource
English translation (2004–2009) by A. S. Kline
The poem L’après-midi d’un Faune in English translation ''The afternoon of a faun'' in yeyebook.com

1876 poems
French poems
Poetry by Stéphane Mallarmé